Vladimir M. Lipunov (born August 17, 1952 in Raichikhinsk, Amur Oblast) is a Soviet and Russian astrophysicist, Professor of  the Moscow State University, Doctor of Physical and Mathematical Sciences (1991), a member of the International Astronomical Union (1993) and the European Astronomical Society (1993). He is also a science fiction writer under the pseudonym Vladimir Khlumov and a member of the Union of Russian Writers.

Biography 
In 1976, he graduated from Moscow State University and until 1979 worked in Kyiv at the Main Astronomical Observatory of the Academy of Sciences of the Ukrainian SSR.

In 1982, he finished his post-graduate course of the Moscow State University under the supervision of the academician Yakov Borisovich Zel'dovich and since 1981 to 1992 was Associated Professor in the Astronomical Department of the Faculty of Physics of Moscow State University and worked at the P.K. Shternberg State Astronomical Institute. Then he began to work as a Professor at the Chair of Astrophysics and Stellar Astronomy of the Moscow State University, where he lectures and conducts seminars up to the present.

Achievements 
In December 2014, Lipunov, with the help of the Master Global Robotic Telescopes Net, recovered a new Potentially hazardous object, according to the Russian news agencies, larger than the already known asteroid 99942 Apophis.  The new asteroid was named 2014 UR116.

He is the author of more than 700 scientific publications, incl. monograph "Astrophysics of Neutron Stars"

As a science fiction writer
He is the author of the plays “The Children of the Stars” (1990), “The Old Song” (1996), “The Night Watch” (1996) and  the novels “The Leaves of Moscow Autumn” (1996), “The Old Virgin Mary” (1997), “ The Lovely”(1998)," The Seagull Named Fedor"(2000), "Master of Smoke Rings" (2000), "Fatal letters" (2002).

In April 1999, Lipunov organized a literary Internet magazine "Russky Pereplet".

Awards and honours 
 Laureate of the All-Union Competition of the Society "Znanie" (1987) 
 M.V. Lomonosov Prize of Moscow State University (2002)
 Honored Educator of the Higher School of the Russian Federation (2006)

References

Living people
1952 births
21st-century Russian scientists
Academic staff of Moscow State University
Soviet astronomers
Russian astronomers
People from Amur Oblast
Moscow State University alumni